Dominique Helena Moceanu (born September 30, 1981) is a retired American gymnast. She was a member of the gold-medal-winning United States women's gymnastics team (the "Magnificent Seven") at the 1996 Summer Olympics in Atlanta.

Moceanu trained under Marta and Béla Károlyi, and later Luminița Miscenco and Mary Lee Tracy. She earned her first national team berth at age 10 and represented the United States in various international competitions at the junior level. She was the all-around silver medalist at the 1992 Junior Pan American Games and the 1994 junior national champion. In 1995, at the age of 13, she became the youngest gymnast to win the senior all-around title at the U.S. National Championships. She was the youngest member of both the 1995 World Championships team and the gold-medal-winning 1996 Olympics team, and was the last gymnast to compete legally in the Olympics at the age of 14.

Moceanu's last major success in gymnastics was at the 1998 Goodwill Games, where she became the first American to win the all-around gold medal. Family problems, coaching changes, and injuries derailed her efforts to make the 2000 Olympics in Sydney, and she retired from the sport in 2000. Since then, she has worked as a coach, studied business management, and written a memoir, Off Balance.

Early career
Moceanu was born in Hollywood, California, on September 30, 1981, to Romanian Americans Dumitru Moceanu (1954–2008) and Camelia Moceanu (née Staicu; b. 1961), both gymnasts. She has two younger siblings, Jennifer Bricker (born 1987), who was born without legs and adopted shortly after birth by Gerald and Sharon Bricker, and Christina Moceanu Chapman (born 1989). She began training as a gymnast at the age of three in Illinois, and at the age of ten, the family relocated to Houston, Texas in order for her to train with Béla Károlyi and Márta Károlyi.

Under the Károlyis' guidance, Moceanu won her first U.S. National Team berth in 1992, followed by five medals, four gold and one silver, later that year, at the 1992 Junior Pan American Artistic Gymnastics Championships. She became the junior national champion in 1994, and, the following year, in 1995, she became the youngest gymnast ever to win the USA Gymnastics National Championships. She was also the youngest member of the U. S. team at the 1995 World Championships, and earned a silver medal.

Moceanu's national and international successes, combined with her bubbly attitude, earned her attention and a wide fan base both in and out of the gymnastics community. In the months leading up to the 1996 Olympics, she was one of the most recognizable faces of USA Gymnastics, eclipsing more decorated teammates such as Shannon Miller and Dominique Dawes. Before the Olympics, she was featured in Vanity Fair and wrote an autobiography, Dominique Moceanu: An American Champion, with Steve Woodward. The book reached No. 7 on The New York Times Best Seller list.

1996 Olympics 
Moceanu was expected to be a major medal threat at the Olympics. However, after the 1996 U.S. Nationals, where she placed third in the all-around, she was diagnosed with a stress fracture in her right tibia. Her injury forced her to sit out the Olympic Trials, but she was petitioned onto the team on the strength of her Nationals scores.

At the Olympics, still struggling with her injury and sporting a heavily bandaged leg, Moceanu contributed to the team gold medal with performances good enough to qualify her for the event finals on balance beam and floor exercise. However, she faltered in the last rotation of team optionals, falling on both vaults. Her teammate Kerri Strug vaulted next and clinched the gold for the U.S., but injured her ankle in the process. Moceanu took Strug's place in the all-around finals, but made a mistake on the balance beam and placed ninth. In the beam final, she fell when she missed a foot on a layout and crashed into the balance beam on her head. She finished the exercise and went on to a strong performance in the floor finals later that day, finishing fourth and just missing a medal.

Post-Olympics career
After the 1996 Olympics, Moceanu participated in professional gymnastics exhibitions, including a 34-city tour, before returning to competition. With the retirement of the Károlyis, she began training with other coaches at Moceanu Gymnastics, a gym built and run by her family.

Out of peak form, Moceanu placed ninth at the 1997 U.S. Nationals. She then led a mostly inexperienced U.S. team at the 1997 World Championships in Lausanne, Switzerland, where she qualified for the all-around final but did not medal.

In 1998, however, she returned to top form. Under her new coach, Luminiţa Miscenco, she adjusted to a significant growth spurt and developed a more mature style. She was selected to compete at the 1998 Goodwill Games, where she became the only American to win the all-around title. In doing so, she defeated the reigning world all-around champion, Svetlana Khorkina, and the world silver and bronze medalists, Simona Amânar and Yelena Produnova. She outscored the second-place finisher, Maria Olaru—who would become the 1999 world all-around champion—by 0.687 points.

Two years later, training with Mary Lee Tracy at Cincinnati Gymnastics Academy, Moceanu placed eighth at the 2000 U.S. Nationals. She qualified for the Olympic Trials but was forced to withdraw with a knee injury.

In the fall of 2000, Moceanu participated in a post-Olympics national exhibition tour. She also participated in the post-Olympics Rock N' Roll Gymnastics Championship Tour in 2004.

After a five-year hiatus from elite gymnastics, Moceanu announced in 2005 that she was returning. An injury kept her from competing that year, but she continued to train on floor and vault, and in the summer of 2006, she was invited to attend the USA Gymnastics national training camp.

Moceanu competed at the 2006 U.S. Classic, where she successfully performed a full-twisting Tsukahara vault. On floor, however, she went out of bounds on her tucked full-in tumbling pass and fell on her double pike, posting one of the lowest scores of the meet. In a decision that proved controversial, she did not qualify to the 2006 National Championships. She stated that USA Gymnastics officials had told her she would qualify if she attended the national training camp and competed at least one event at the U.S. Classic. But after the Classic, she was told that she had needed a combined score on two events of 28.0 or higher to qualify; her combined score on vault and floor was 27.1. She appealed the decision, but it was upheld.

She now coaches part-time at Gymnastics World in Broadview Heights, Ohio, and conducts clinics and private lessons around the country.

Moceanu runs the Dominique Moceanu Gymnastics Center and Carmen Yoga Studio in Medina, Ohio, USA; where her son Vincent Canales also trains.

Personal life
Moceanu was raised in the Romanian Orthodox Church, and has said that her faith was a source of comfort during her gymnastics career. In an interview with Christianity Today, in 2012, she said her sisters, Jennifer and Christina, are also Christian, and that they all felt their separation as children and eventual reunion as adults was part of God's plan.

On October 27, 1998, Moceanu was emancipated by a Houston court, eleven months prior to her 18th birthday. Moceanu had reportedly run away from home earlier that month, on October 17, and filed for emancipation on October 19. She accused her parents of abuse and exploitation and alleged they had used US$4,000,000 of her earnings to build a 70,000 square foot gymnastics training center in Spring, Texas. Moceanu's parents ultimately decided not to fight her in court, and she was given control over her future earnings and allowed to live independently, though her father remained in charge of her trust. The family ultimately settled her past earning privately. Despite her father's claim that the family gym was a financial success, it permanently closed in February 1999, less than two years after it opened. She eventually reconciled with her father, with him walking her down the aisle at her wedding in 2006.

Moceanu is married to Dr. Michael Canales, a podiatrist and collegiate gymnast. The two wed on November 4, 2006, in Houston, Texas, in a Romanian Orthodox ceremony attended by fellow gymnasts Paul Hamm, Morgan Hamm, Bart Conner, and Nadia Comăneci. They first met in 1994, when Moceanu was 12 years old. Together, they have two children, Carmen Noel Canales (born December 25, 2007) and Vincent Michael Canales (born March 13, 2009). Vincent is reportedly interested in pursuing a career in gymnastics, appearing on American Ninja Warrior Junior in 2020 and voiced hope to compete in the 2028 Summer Olympics. In October 2021, Moceanu announced she was pregnant with her third child. The family resides in Ohio, where Canales practices medicine and Moceanu operates her own gymnastics training center.

Moceanu attended Northland Christian School as a teenager and went onto graduate from John Carroll University, earning a degree in business administration in 2009.

In her memoir Off Balance, Moceanu revealed that she has a younger sister, Jennifer Bricker, who was born without legs and was given up for adoption at the hospital at birth. Bricker is an acrobat and aerialist who idolized Moceanu before finding out they were sisters.

In Off Balance, Moceanu also alleged that Béla and Marta Károlyi were abusive and manipulative when she trained under them.

Moceanu, Jamie Dantzscher and Jessica Howard testified at a Senate Judiciary Committee hearing on March 28, 2017, about the USA Gymnastics sex abuse scandal.

Major results

 2000 U.S. Championships — 8th all-around
 2000 U.S. Classic — 6th all-around
 1998 Goodwill Games — 1st all-around
 1998 U.S. Championships — 3rd all-around; 1st beam; 1st vault; 3rd floor
 1997 World Championships — 6th team; 14th all-around
 1997 U.S. Championships — 9th all-around; 2nd floor
 1997 International Team Championships — 2nd team; 17th all-around (two events only)
 1996 Olympic Games — 1st team; 9th all-around; 4th floor; 6th beam
 1996 U.S. Championships — 3rd all-around
 1995 World Championships — 3rd team; 5th all-around; 2nd beam; 7th floor
 1995 U.S. Championships — 1st all-around; 2nd floor; 3rd vault; 5th beam; 6th bars
 1995 U.S. Classic — 2nd all-around
 1994 U.S. Championships — 1st all-around (junior)
 1993 U.S. Championships — 7th all-around (junior)
 1993 U.S. Classic — 8th all-around (junior)
 1993 U.S. Olympic Festival — 12th all-around (junior)
 1992 Pan American Games — 1st team, vault, bars, floor; 2nd all-around (junior)
 1992 U.S. Championships — 5th all-around (junior)
 1992 U.S. Classic — 10th all-around (junior)
 1991 U.S. Classic — 7th all-around (junior)

References

External links

 
 
 
 Interview with Dominique Moceanu on her faith and the Olympics
 Off Balance: A Memoir - Dominique Moceanu with Paul & Teri Williams, 2012, Simon & Schuster, New York, NY, 
 
 
 

1981 births
Living people
Sportspeople from California
American female artistic gymnasts
American people of Romanian descent
Cuyahoga Community College alumni
Gymnasts at the 1996 Summer Olympics
John Carroll University alumni
Medalists at the World Artistic Gymnastics Championships
Olympic gold medalists for the United States in gymnastics
People from Hollywood, Los Angeles
Medalists at the 1996 Summer Olympics
U.S. women's national team gymnasts
Goodwill Games medalists in gymnastics
Competitors at the 1998 Goodwill Games
21st-century American women